Norbert Huber (born 3 September 1964) is an Italian luger who competed from the early 1980s to the late 1990s.

Huber was born in Bruneck, South Tyrol.  Competing in four Winter Olympics, he won two medals in the men's doubles event with a silver in 1994 and a bronze in 1992.

Huber also won ten medals at the FIL World Luge Championships in with two gold (Mixed team: 1989, Men's doubles: 1990), four silvers (Men's doubles: 1983, 1989, 1993; Mixed team: 1990), and four bronzes (Men's singles: 1999, Men's doubles: 1991, Mixed team: 1991, 1993).

He also won fourteen medals in the FIL European Luge Championships with three gold (Men's doubles: 1992, 1994; Mixed team: 1994), five silvers (Men's singles: 1984, 1992; Men's doubles: 1988, 1990; Mixed team: 1998), and six bronzes (Men's singles: 1998, Men's doubles: 1984, 1986; Mixed team: 1988, 1990, 1992).

Huber also won 26 World Cup races and ten overall Luge World Cup titles (men's singles: 1984-5, 1985-6, 1986-7; men's doubles: 1984-5, 1985-6, 1988-9, 1989–90, 1990-1, 1991-2, 1992-3).

References

1984 luge men's singles results
1984 luge men's doubles results
1992 luge men's singles results
1992 luge men's doubles results
1994 luge men's doubles results
1998 luge men's singles results

1964 births
Living people
Sportspeople from Bruneck
Italian male lugers
Lugers at the 1984 Winter Olympics
Lugers at the 1992 Winter Olympics
Lugers at the 1994 Winter Olympics
Lugers at the 1998 Winter Olympics
Olympic lugers of Italy
Olympic medalists in luge
Medalists at the 1992 Winter Olympics
Medalists at the 1994 Winter Olympics
Olympic silver medalists for Italy
Olympic bronze medalists for Italy
Lugers of Centro Sportivo Carabinieri
Germanophone Italian people